Binar Bening Berlian is a soap opera that airs in RCTI. This soap opera is produced by SinemArt. Supported by beautiful actress and handsome actors such as Asmirandah Zantman, Celine Evangelista, Irish Bella, Jonas Rivanno, Ashraf Sinclair, Christian Sugiono, Ari Wibowo, Vira Yuniar, Tia Ivanka, Teuku Ryan and others. Directed by Sanjeev Kumar and story written by Serena Luna.

Cast

External links 
 Sinopsis Binar Bening Berlian
 RCTI

Indonesian television soap operas